Xi Virginis (ξ Vir, ξ Virginis) is a solitary star in the zodiac constellation of Virgo. It is bright enough to be seen with the naked eye, having an apparent visual magnitude of 4.83. The distance to this star is about 122 light years, as determined from parallax readings.

Xi Virginis is an A-type main sequence star with a stellar classification of A4 V. It has an estimated age of 480 million years and is spinning rapidly with a projected rotational velocity of 130 km/s. It has about 150% the Sun's radius and shines with 12.6 times the luminosity of the Sun.

References

Virginis, Xi
Virgo (constellation)
A-type main-sequence stars
Virginis, 002
057328
4515
102124
Durchmusterung objects